James Reese Europe (February 22, 1881 – May 9, 1919) was an American ragtime and early jazz bandleader, arranger, and composer. He was the leading figure on the African Americans music scene of New York City in the 1910s. Eubie Blake called him the "Martin Luther King of music".

Early life 
Europe was born in Mobile, Alabama, to Henry Jefferson Europe (1848–1899) and Loraine Saxon (maiden; 1849–1930).  His family – which included four siblings, Minnie Europe (Mrs. George Mayfield; 1868–1931), Ida S. Europe (1870–1919), John Newton Europe (1875–1932), and Mary Loraine (1883–1947) – moved to Washington, D.C., when he was 10. 

Europe moved to New York in 1904. He had a son, James Reese Europe Jr (1917-2001) with Bessie Simms (1888-1931).

Band leader 

In 1910, Europe organized the Clef Club, a society for Black Americans in the music industry.  In 1912, the club made history when it played a concert at Carnegie Hall for the benefit of the Colored Music Settlement School.  The Clef Club Orchestra, while not a jazz band, was the first band to play proto-jazz at Carnegie Hall.  It is difficult to overstate the importance of that event in the history of jazz in the United States – it was 12 years before the Paul Whiteman and George Gershwin concert at Aeolian Hall, and 26 years before Benny Goodman's famed concert at Carnegie Hall. The Clef Club's performances played music written solely by Black composers, including Harry T. Burleigh and Samuel Coleridge-Taylor.  Europe's orchestra also included Will Marion Cook, who had not been in Carnegie Hall since his own performance as solo violinist in 1896. Cook was the first black composer to launch full musical productions, fully scored with a cast and story every bit as classical as any Victor Herbert operetta. In the words of Gunther Schuller, Europe "... had stormed the bastion of the white establishment and made many members of New York's cultural elite aware of Negro music for the first time". The New York Times remarked, "These composers are beginning to form an art of their own"; yet by their third performance, a review in Musical America said Europe's Clef Club should "give its attention during the coming year to a movement or two of a Haydn Symphony".

In 1913 and 1914, he made a series of phonograph records for the Victor Talking Machine Company.  These recordings are some of the best examples of the pre-jazz hot ragtime style of the U.S. Northeast of the 1910s. These are some of the most accepted quotes that are in place to protect the idea that the Original Dixieland Jass Band recorded the first jass (spelling later changed) pieces in 1917 for Victor. Unlike Europe's post-War recordings, the Victor recordings were not called nor marketed as "jazz" at the time, and were far from the first recordings of ragtime by Black American musicians.

Neither the Clef Club Orchestra nor the Society Orchestra were small "Dixieland" style bands. They were large symphonic bands to satisfy the tastes of a public that was used to performances by the likes of the John Philip Sousa band and similar organizations very popular at the time. The Clef Orchestra had 125 members and played on various occasions between 1912 and 1915 in Carnegie Hall. It is instructive to read a comment from a music review in the New York Times from March 12, 1914: "... the programme consisted largely of plantation melodies and spirituals [arranged such as to show that] these composers are beginning to develop an art of their own based on their folk material ..."

Europe was known for his outspoken personality and unwillingness to bend to musical conventions, particularly in his insistence on playing his own style of music. He responded to criticism by saying, "We have developed a kind of symphony music that, no matter what else you think, is different and distinctive, and that lends itself to the playing of the peculiar compositions of our race ... My success had come ... from a realization of the advantages of sticking to the music of my own people." And later, "We colored people have our own music that is part of us. It's the product of our souls; it's been created by the sufferings and miseries of our race."

He was one of the first African-American musicians to make it to mainstream.

Compositions 

Some of Europe's best-known compositions include several that were co-composed with Ford Dabney (1883–1958) for the famed dancers Irene and Vernon Castle. The Castles regarded Europe's Society Orchestra among the best they had worked with and hired Europe late in 1913 as their preferred band leader with Dabney as their arranger.

Co-compositions

Co-composed with Dabney for the Castles; Joseph W. Stern (1870–1934), publisher
The Castle Walk trot and one-step (©1914)
Argentine tango
Castle Combination, waltz-trot
Congratulations Valse (also known as Castle Lame Duck), waltz
Castle Valse Classique humoreske – this was an adaptation by Dabney of Antonin Dvořák's Humoresque, Op. 101, No. 7 (of 8), Poco lento e grazioso in G major
Castle Perfect Trot one trot, arranged by Carl F. Williams (image of the violin part)
Castle Maxixe Brazilian maxixe
Castles Half and Half – in quintuple meter –  
Enticement – Argentine idyl (a non-Castle tango), by Eporue Yenbad (surname ananyms used as pseudonyms for Europe and Dabney), arranged by William H. Penn (né William Henry Penn; 1868–1929) 
At That San Francisco Fair lyrics by Schuyler Greene (né Schuyler Rawson Greene; 1880–1929), music by Dabney, Europe, and Kern; published by T. B. Harms & Francis, Day & Hunter, Inc. performed in Act 2, sang by the character Miss Tony Miller with chorus; Miller was played by Adele Rowland and Zoe Barnett.
Co-composed with Dabney for Jerome Kern and Bolton's Nobody Home (1915)
The 1915 production, Nobody Home, at the Princess Theatre, was an American debut of a 1905 English musical, Mr. Popple of Ippleton.  Princess Theatre April 20, 1915, through June 1915; Maxine Elliott's Theatre June 7, 1915, through August 7, 1915.
Co-composed with Dabney, lyrics by Gene Buck, for Ziegfeld's Midnight Frolic, sang by Nora Bayes; Francis, Day & Hunter Ltd., publisher Boy of Mine.

Composed solely by Europe

Composed solely by Europe for the Castles; G. Ricordi & Co., publisher
Castle Doggy foxtrot

Military service 

During World War I, Europe obtained a commission in the New York Army National Guard, where he fought as a lieutenant with the 369th Infantry Regiment (the "Harlem Hellfighters") when it was assigned to the French Army. He went on to direct the regimental band to great acclaim. In February and March 1918, James Reese Europe and his military band travelled over 2,000 miles in France, performing for British, French and American military audiences as well as French civilians. Europe's "Hellfighters" also made their first recordings in France for the Pathé brothers. The first concert included a French march, and the Stars and Stripes Forever as well as syncopated numbers such as "The Memphis Blues", which, according to a later description of the concert by band member Noble Sissle "... started ragtimitis in France".

Post-war career 

After his return home in February 1919, he stated, "I have come from France more firmly convinced than ever that Negros should write Negro music. We have our own racial feeling and if we try to copy whites we will make bad copies ... We won France by playing music which was ours and not a pale imitation of others, and if we are to develop in America we must develop along our own lines." In 1919, Europe made more recordings for Pathé Records. These include both instrumentals and accompaniments with vocalist Noble Sissle who, with Eubie Blake, would later have great success with their 1921 production of Shuffle Along, which gives us the classic song "I'm Just Wild About Harry". Differing in style from Europe's recordings of a few years earlier, they incorporate blues, blue notes, and early jazz influences.

Death 

On the night of May 9, 1919, Europe performed for the last time. He had been feeling ill all day, but wanted to go on with the concert (which was to be the first of three in Boston's Mechanics Hall). During the intermission Europe went to have a talk with two of his drummers, Steve and Herbert Wright. After Europe criticized some of their behavior (walking off stage during others' performances), Herbert Wright became very agitated and threw his drumsticks down in a seemingly unwarranted outburst of anger. He claimed Europe did not treat him well and that he was tired of getting blamed for others' mistakes. He lunged for Europe with a penknife and was able to stab him in the neck. Europe told his band to finish the set and he would see them the next morning. To Europe and his band the wound seemed superficial. As he was carried away, he told them "I'll get along alright." At the hospital, they could not stop the bleeding and he died hours later.

News of Europe's death spread fast. Composer and band leader W. C. Handy wrote: "The man who had just come through the baptism of war's fire and steel without a mark had been stabbed by one of his own musicians ... The sun was in the sky. The new day promised peace. But all the suns had gone down for Jim Europe, and Harlem didn't seem the same." Europe was granted the first ever public funeral for a black American in the city of New York. Tanney Johnson said of his death: "Before Jim Europe came to New York, the colored man knew nothing but Negro dances and porter's work. All that has been changed. Jim Europe was the living open sesame to the colored porters of this city. He took them from their porters' places and raised them to positions of importance as real musicians. I think the suffering public ought to know that in Jim Europe, the race has lost a leader, a benefactor, and a true friend."

At the time of his death, he was the best-known black-American bandleader in the United States. He was buried at Arlington National Cemetery, in Arlington, Virginia. Europe was mentioned by F. Scott Fitzgerald in his short story "No Flowers".

Herbert Wright was convicted of manslaughter, and served eight years in prison.

See also 

 The Frogs (club)
 African American musical theater

References 
Notes

Further reading

External links 

 
 , Schomburg Center for Research in Black Culture
 Europe's Society Orchestra Article and audio of the 1913–1914 recordings at Red Hot Jazz Archive
 Jim Europe's 369th Infantry "Hellfighters" Band. Article and audio of the 1919 recordings on redhotjazz.com
  Songs Brought Back from the Battlefield
  University of Michigan Exhibition
  From Ken Burns film Jazz.
  An on-line discography
 
 James Reese Europe Appreciation Project.
 BBC Radio 4 The Jazz Kings Go to War

1881 births
1919 deaths
Military personnel from Mobile, Alabama
1919 crimes in the United States
African-American jazz composers
African-American jazz musicians
African Americans in World War I
20th-century African-American musicians
African-American United States Army personnel
American jazz bandleaders
American jazz mandolinists
American manslaughter victims
American ragtime mandolinists
Burials at Arlington National Cemetery
Deaths by stabbing in Massachusetts
Jazz musicians from Alabama
Musicians from Mobile, Alabama
Ragtime composers
United States Army officers
United States Army personnel of World War I
United States military musicians